is a Japanese football player.

Playing career
Murata was born in Osaka Prefecture on July 22, 2000. He joined J2 League club FC Gifu in 2018.

References

External links

2000 births
Living people
Association football people from Osaka Prefecture
Japanese footballers
J2 League players
FC Gifu players
Association football forwards